The Mighty Two is an album by American drummers Louis Bellson and Gene Krupa recorded in 1963 and released on the Roulette label. The album was conceived as a drum instruction disc demonstrating rudimental drum techniques with Bellson and Krupa fronting an eight piece band along with two solo performances by the two co-leaders.

Reception

AllMusic awarded the album 3 stars.

Track listing
All compositions by Fred Thompson 
 "The Mighty Two" - 2:26
 "The Three Drags" - 2:07
 "Paradiddle Song" - 2:10
 "Accent on Flamboyance" - 2:20
 "Rolls ala Bossa Nova" - 2:23
 "The Mighty Two Alone Together" - 2:30
 "Rolls ala Bossa Nova #2" - 2:23
 "More Flams" - 2:18
 "Swingin' the Rudiments" - 2:25
 "Que Sticks" - 2:18
 "Two in One" - 2:38
 "Rythmic Excursion" - 2:16

Personnel
Louis Bellson, Gene Krupa - drums
Joe Newman, Joe Wilder - trumpet (tracks 1-5 & 7-10)
Tyree Glenn - trombone (tracks 1-5 & 7-10)
Phil Woods - alto saxophone (tracks 1-5 & 7-10)
Dick Hyman - piano (tracks 1-5 & 7-10)
Mary Osborne - guitar (tracks 1-5 & 7-10)
Milt Hinton - bass (tracks 1-5 & 7-10)
Fred Thompson - arranger

References

Gene Krupa albums
Louie Bellson albums
Albums produced by Teddy Reig
1963 albums
Roulette Records albums